Indranil "Neil" Chatterjee is an American lawyer, political advisor, and government official who was a member of the Federal Energy Regulatory Commission. He was Chairman of the Federal Energy Regulatory Commission from August 10, 2017 to December 7, 2017, and again from October 24, 2018 until he was removed from the position by President Donald Trump on November 5, 2020.

Chatterjee previously served as energy policy advisor to United States Senate Majority Leader Mitch McConnell.

Chatterjee also worked for the United States House Committee on Ways and Means, the National Rural Electric Cooperative Association, and House Republican Conference Chairwoman Deborah Pryce.

Chatterjee was confirmed by the United States Senate as a member of the Federal Energy Regulatory Commission on August 3, 2017. On August 10, 2017, President Donald Trump designated Chatterjee as chairman of FERC. On December 7, 2017, Kevin J. McIntyre succeeded Chatterjee as the chairman of FERC. On October 24, 2018, President Donald Trump again designated Chatterjee as Chairman of the Commission. The day after the 2020 election, Chatterjee was fired as chairman.  He remained a commissioner until his term expired in 2021.

References

External links

 Biography at the Federal Energy Regulatory Commission

Living people
St. Lawrence University alumni
University of Cincinnati College of Law alumni
Trump administration personnel
21st-century American lawyers
American politicians of Indian descent
New York (state) Republicans
Year of birth missing (living people)
Federal Energy Regulatory Commission chairpersons
Asian conservatism in the United States